Drasteria biformata is a moth of the family Erebidae. It is found in North America, where it has been recorded from Arizona and California.

The wingspan is 41–42 mm. Adults have been recorded on wing in January and from April to August.

References

Drasteria
Moths described in 1878
Moths of North America